Amir Absalem (born 19 June 1997) is a Dutch professional footballer who plays as a left-back for Eerste Divisie club ADO Den Haag.

Club career
On 25 August 2022, Absalem signed a one-season deal with ADO Den Haag.

Personal life
Absalem was born in the Netherlands to a Moroccan-Algerian father, and Dutch mother.

References

External links
 
 

1997 births
Living people
People from Capelle aan den IJssel
Dutch footballers
Dutch people of Algerian descent
Dutch sportspeople of Moroccan descent
FC Groningen players
Almere City FC players
Roda JC Kerkrade players
ADO Den Haag players
Eredivisie players
Eerste Divisie players
Derde Divisie players
Association football defenders
Footballers from South Holland